In the 2014–15 season, MC Alger competed in the Ligue 1 for the 44th season, as well as the Algerian Cup. It is their 12th consecutive season in the top flight of Algerian football.

Squad list
Players and squad numbers last updated on 18 November 2014.Note: Flags indicate national team as has been defined under FIFA eligibility rules. Players may hold more than one non-FIFA nationality.

Competitions

Overview

Algerian Super Cup

The 2014 Algerian Super Cup is the  8th edition of Algerian Super Cup, competition with only one match organized by the professional Football League (LFP) and the Algerian Football Federation (FAF) since 2013, which opposes Algerian Ligue Professionnelle 1 the winner of the Algerian Cup. the competition takes place this season Stade Mustapha Tchaker to Blida For the second time.

The meeting therefore opposed USM Alger 2013-2014 champion of Algeria, the MC Alger, winner of the 2013–14 Algerian Cup. The rules of the game are: the duration of the game is 90 minutes and in case of a tie, a session penalties is performed to separate the teams. Three substitutions are allowed for each team.

Ligue 1

The Ligue 1 2014-2015 is the fifty-first edition of Algerian Ligue Professionnelle 1 and the fifth under the name Ligue 1. Division opposes sixteen clubs in a series of thirty meetings. The best in the league qualify for the African cups that are the Champions League (the podium) and Confederation Cup (the third and the winner national cup).

The relegated the previous season, JSM Bejaia on CA Bordj Bou Arreridj and CRB Ain Fakroun are replaced by USM Bel-Abbès, Ligue 2 in 2013-2014 after a year's absence, the ASM Oran, 7 years after his last appearance at the highest national level, and NA Hussein Dey relegated to Ligue 2 during the 2010–2011 season.

League table

Results summary

Results by round

Matches

Algerian Cup

CAF Confederation Cup

Preliminary round

Squad information

Playing statistics

|-

|-
! colspan=14 style=background:#dcdcdc; text-align:center| Players transferred out during the season

Goalscorers
Includes all competitive matches. The list is sorted alphabetically by surname when total goals are equal.

Transfers

In

Out

References

MC Alger seasons
Algerian football clubs 2014–15 season